Korea Express Air (KEA) was an air taxi airline, with its head office in Nam-myeon (KO), Taean, South Chungcheong Province, and with flight operations based in Yangyang International Airport.

Destinations

Fleet
As of October 2019, Korea Express Air fleet consisted of the following aircraft:

See also
Transport in South Korea
List of companies of South Korea
List of airlines of South Korea
List of airports in South Korea

References

External links
 Korea Express Air 

Airlines of South Korea
Airlines established in 2005
Airlines disestablished in 2020
South Korean companies established in 2005